David Lester may refer to:

 David Lester (biochemist) (1926–1990), American biochemist
 David Lester (musician), guitar player for Mecca Normal, book author and publisher
 David Lester (psychologist) (born 1942), British-American psychologist